Zutendaal (in English sometimes also referred to as "Sweet Valley") is a municipality located in the Belgian province of Limburg. On 1 January 2017 Zutendaal had a total population of 7,269. The total area is 32.07 km2, giving a population density of 227 inhabitants per km2.

In addition to Zutendaal itself, the municipality includes the following population centres: Gewaai, Papendaal, Besmer, Broek, Stalken, Roelen, Daal, and Wiemesmeer.

Etymology 
The first written mention of Zutendaal was in 1292 under the name of Suerbroeck, indicating that the land around the village was acidic and swampy. From 1345 the name changed to Zuetendael which literally translates to "Sweet Valley". Indicating there were a lot of freshwater sources around the village.

Demographic evolution 

 Bronnen:NIS, Opm:1806 tot en met 1981=volkstellingen; 1990 en later= inwonertal op 1 januari

References

External links

 - Available only in Dutch

Municipalities of Limburg (Belgium)